Covali is the Romanian form of the Russian surname Kovalyov derived from the occupation of "forger" or "blacksmith".

The surname may refer to:

Serghei Covaliov (1944–2011), Romanian sprint canoeist
Alexandr Covaliov, Moldovan Paralympics swimmer

Romanian-language surnames
Russian-language surnames